Richard Ranglin (born September 27, 1984) is a former American football offensive lineman. He was signed out of the Arena Football League in May 2012 by the Kansas City Chiefs.

College career
Ranglin was a four-year letterman at Central Connecticut State University from 2003 to 2007, He Ranglin earned second-team All-Northeast Conference honors. With Ranglin CCSU won its first two NEC titles in 2004 and 2005, he played in 42 games during his four years with the team. However Ragnlin went undrafted in the 2007 NFL Draft.

Professional career
After college Raglin played for several Arena Football, winning Spalding Offensive Lineman of the Year in 2011 while playing all 18 games for the Kansas City Command. In 2012 he began playing for the San Jose SaberCats before signing with the Kansas City Chiefs of the National Football League in May. He was the first CCSU Football alumni to appear on an NFL teams 53 man roster. Ranglin spent the entire 2012 season with the Chiefs appearing in 4 game, he was released in April 2013.

He resigned with the San Jose SaberCats after his release by the Chiefs and played there until the team folded in the fall of 2015, less than three months after winning ArenaBowl XXVIII

Personal life
His son Kiki Richard Ranglin was born in June 9, 2011 and his daughter Mercy Rae was born on May 26, 2013.

References

External links
Kansas City Chiefs bio

1984 births
Living people
People from Yonkers, New York
Central Connecticut Blue Devils football players
Manchester Wolves players
Milwaukee Iron players
Kansas City Command players
Kansas City Chiefs players
San Jose SaberCats players